Gethsemane Lutheran Church is a historic Lutheran church in downtown Austin, Texas. Designated as a Recorded Texas Historic Landmark and listed on the National Register of Historic Places (together with neighboring Luther Hall), the building currently holds offices of the Texas Historical Commission.

History
The first Swedish Lutheran Church in Austin began meeting in 1868. In late 1882 the Swedish Lutherans decided to build a new meeting place near the Texas State Capitol grounds. Construction was completed the following year, after which the congregation occupied the building. A second structure, named Luther Hall, was built adjacent to the main building in 1940 to provide additional meeting and activity space. The congregation relocated to a new space in 1961, after which the facility was purchased by the State of Texas and became part of the State Capitol Complex.

After the Lutheran congregation left the church in 1961, community members began arguing for historical preservation of the structure. The church was designated a Recorded Texas Historic Landmark in 1962, and the sanctuary was added to the National Register of Historic Places on August 25, 1970. The NRHP listing was later expanded to include neighboring Luther Hall on December 23, 2004.

The facility was renovated and restored between 1970 and 1971 to serve as office, library and museum space for the Texas Historical Commission, together with the nearby Carrington–Covert House. Since 1998 the sanctuary has held the THC's library, while Luther Hall currently provides office space for the commission's History Programs Division.

Architecture
The Gethsemane Lutheran Church sanctuary building is a rectangular two-story hall of tan bricks atop a limestone foundation and basement with a gray pressed tin roof, featuring a square bell tower and steeple rising another story higher from the center front. The building is designed in a Gothic revival style, with brick buttresses and cornices and tall lancet windows with brick hood moulds. The church's designing architect was August Swenson, and its builder was Fredric Reichow, with S. A. Carlson as contractor.

The sanctuary building has a rectangular plan oriented east-to-west, with the main facade and tower on the east and an apse on the west. The main entrance is in the base of the projecting steeple, in the form of a Gothic arch with a stained-glass transom window above paneled wood double doors. The second level of the tower features a stained-glass lancet window and is topped by a cornice. Above the cornice, a hipped roof narrows the tower to an octagonal Carpenter Gothic cupola and belfry, topped by a conical roof terminating in a cross-shaped finial.

The north and south faces of the building each display five parallel stained-glass lancet windows separated by brick buttresses. The entrance arch and all the windows include brick hood moulds. The exterior bricks for the building were salvaged from the ruins of the second (1852) Texas State Capitol, which burned in 1881, and the main doors were taken from the University of Texas at Austin's Old Main building in the 1930s when it was demolished to make way for the current Main Building.

Luther Hall
Luther Hall is a two-story rectangular hall of brick and limestone on a concrete foundation, situated immediately to the west of the sanctuary. The hall was designed in a Modern Movement style, with simple symmetrical lines. The main facade features a recessed entry with double doors and a transom (recalling the sanctuary's main entry) beneath a stepped parapet bearing a medallion representing the coat of arms of Martin Luther.

See also
National Register of Historic Places listings in Travis County, Texas
Recorded Texas Historic Landmarks in Travis County

References

External links
 

19th-century Lutheran churches in the United States
Bell towers in the United States
Churches completed in 1882
Churches in Austin, Texas
Churches on the National Register of Historic Places in Texas
City of Austin Historic Landmarks
Gothic Revival church buildings in Texas
National Register of Historic Places in Austin, Texas
Recorded Texas Historic Landmarks
1882 establishments in Texas